The Instituto Hondureño de Antropología e Historia (IHAH, Honduran Institute of Anthropology and History) is a government institution in the republic of Honduras.

It formed on July 22, 1952, by Decree No. 24 originally under the name of National Institute of Anthropology and History under the government of Dr. Juan Manuel Gálvez.

In 1968, Decree No. 118, changed its name to the Instituto Hondureño de Antropología e Historia , which changed its administrative autonomy, legal personality and own patrimony.

The IHAH has a website, where their publications are available daily.

The Honduran Institute of Anthropology and History has the following departments:

Department of Anthropological Research (DIA)
Department of Historical Research
Department of Museums
Restoration Department
Department of Protection of Cultural Heritage

References
This article was initially translated from the Spanish Wikipedia.

External links
Official site

Institutions of Honduras
1952 establishments in Honduras
Mesoamerican studies